Cedars Ski Resort Bsharri is a ski resort located in the Bsharri mountains of north Lebanon. The natural area known as Cedars of God is nearby. Ariz (or Arz) means cedar in Arabic, and is sometimes used to refer to the area.
It is Lebanon's oldest ski area and home to Lebanon's first ski lift, built in 1953. It is at Bcharreh mountain.

See also
 Skiing in Lebanon

References

External links
Ski Lebanon description of the resort

Sport in Lebanon
Sports venues in Lebanon
Ski areas and resorts in Lebanon